James Bayard may refer to:
James Asherton Bayard (1859–1919), seventh Secretary of the Arizona Territory
James Asheton Bayard I (c. 1730–1770), Philadelphia doctor, and father of James A. Bayard (politician, born 1767)
James A. Bayard (politician, born 1767) (1767–1815), politician and lawyer from Wilmington, Delaware
James A. Bayard Jr. (1799–1880), politician and lawyer from Wilmington, Delaware

See also
Bayard family